36 Serpentis is a binary star system in the equatorial constellation of Serpens. It has the Bayer designation b Serpentis, while 36 Serpentis is the Flamsteed designation. The system is visible to the naked eye as a dim, white-hued point of light with a combined apparent visual magnitude of 5.09. It is located 162 light years away from the Sun based on parallax, and is moving closer with a radial velocity of −8 km/s.

This is a spectroscopic binary star system with a long orbital period of 52.8 years and a high eccentricity of 0.83. Gray et al. (2017) found a merged stellar classification of A2IV-Vn for this system, while Cowley et al. matched it with a class of A3Vn, where the 'n' indicates "nebulous" lines caused by rapid rotation.

The primary component is a Lambda Boötis star, meaning that it has solar-like amounts of carbon, nitrogen, and oxygen, while containing very low amounts of iron peak elements. It is an A7 class main sequence star of visual magnitude 5.2 that is spinning rapidly, showing a projected rotational velocity of 229. The star is 723 million years old with around double the mass of the Sun. It is radiating 19 times the Sun's luminosity from its photosphere at an effective temperature of 8,246 K.

The cooler secondary component, a G0 star, is the source for the X-ray emission that has been detected coming from this system. It has a visual magnitude of 7.8.

References

A-type main-sequence stars
G-type main-sequence stars
Lambda Boötis stars
Binary stars
Serpens (constellation)
Serpentis, b
BD-02 4058
Serpentis, 36
141851
77660
5895